Muehlenbeckia axillaris (creeping wire vine, sprawling wire vine, matted lignum) is a low evergreen shrub, forming wiry mats up to about  in diameter, native to New Zealand, and the Australian states of Tasmania, New South Wales and Victoria. Flowers are inconspicuous, yellowish-white,  in diameter, and borne in groups of up to three in the axils.

The plant is hardy, drought-tolerant, and quick-growing, thriving in a range of light conditions. It can be cultivated as a ground cover and grows well in rocky ground, as well as standard potting soil. Although it grows fastest in warm seasons, it tolerates freezing weather.

Taxonomy
The species was first described by Joseph Dalton Hooker in 1847, who used the name "Polygonum (Muhlenbeckia) axillaris". Both Stephan Endlicher (in 1848) and Wilhelm Gerhard Walpers (in 1849) later referred to it as just Muehlenbeckia axillaris.

Synonyms
Pseudanthus tasmanicus

References

External links
Threatened Flora of Tasmania
GBIF entry

axillaris
Caryophyllales of Australia
Flora of New South Wales
Flora of Tasmania
Flora of Victoria (Australia)
Plants described in 1847